RFTT may refer to:

 Rocket from the Tombs, an American rock band
 Reach for the Top, a Canadian high school quiz competition